Brit Poalei Eretz Yisrael Nazareth F.C. was an Arab football club from Nazareth, Israel. The club was organized within Brit Poalei Eretz Yisrael, an Arab Workers Union affiliated with the Histadrut.

The club joined the Liga Meuhedet (lit. 'Special League'), becoming one of the first two Arab clubs in the Israeli football leagues (along with Brit Poalei Eretz Yisrael Haifa). The club finished 6th of its division and folded as the workers union was dissolved.

References

Defunct football clubs in Israel
Arab-Israeli football clubs
Association football clubs established in 1949
Association football clubs disestablished in 1952
1949 establishments in Israel
1952 disestablishments in Israel